The Noronha wrasse (Thalassoma norohanum) is a species of wrasse native to the western Atlantic Ocean off the coast of Brazil and nearby islands, where it inhabits coral reefs from the surface to  deep, though mostly much shallower, between .  Younger individuals act as cleaner fish.  This species can reach  in standard length.  It can also be found in the aquarium trade.

References

Noronha wrasse
Fish described in 1890
Taxobox binomials not recognized by IUCN